Midalakkadu is a Developing City  in the Kanniyakumari district in the Indian state of Tamil Nadu. It is a junction of four roads.

Geography 
Coastal villages are Midalam in the west side, Kurumpanai in the south side, Karungal in the north side and Palapallam in the east side.

Midalakkadu is located in the center of Karungal and Kurumpanai.

Climate
Summers are humid with temperature that reach 34 °C. Monsoon months are from June till September with an average temperature of about 25 °C. Winters start from November and end in February with an average temperature of 22 °C.

References
 ^ "Census of India 2001: Data from the 2001 Census, including cities, villages and towns (Provisional)".^ "Census of India 2001: Data from the 2001 Census, including cities, villages and towns (Provisional)". Census Commission of India. Archived from the original on 2004-06-16. Retrieved 2008-11-01.

Cities and towns in Kanyakumari district